Scopula neophyta is a moth of the Geometridae family. It is found in Colombia.

The wingspan is 21–23 mm. The forewings are white with a tinge of brown and with sparse blackish irroration. The hindwings are also white with an ill-defined postmedian line of brown or blackish vein-dots.

References

Moths described in 1922
neophyta
Moths of South America